The buff-tip (Phalera bucephala) is a moth of the family Notodontidae. It is found throughout Europe and in Asia to eastern Siberia. The species was first described by Carl Linnaeus in his 1758 10th edition of Systema Naturae.

Description
This is a fairly large, heavy-bodied species with a wingspan of 55–68 mm. The forewings are grey with a large prominent buff patch at the apex. As the thoracic hair is also buff, the moth resembles a broken twig when at rest. The hindwings are creamy white. This moth flies at night in June and July and sometimes comes to light, although it is not generally strongly attracted.

The young larvae are gregarious, becoming solitary later. The older larva is very striking, black with white and yellow lines. It feeds on many trees and shrubs (see list below). The species overwinters as a pupa.

  The flight season refers to the British Isles. This may vary in other parts of the range.

Natural History
Historically, the buff-tip moth has been referred to as a pest due to their tendency to feast upon apple trees in Lithuania during the 1900s. Outbreaks of this species may increase in areas with high levels of environmental nitrogen compounds.

Recorded food plants
For details see Robinson et al., 2010.
Acer – Norway maple
Betula – birch

Castanea - chestnut
Corylus – hazel
Ribes - currant
Laburnum
Populus – poplar
Prunus
Quercus – oak
Robinia
Rosa – rose
Salix – willow
Tilia – lime
Ulmus – elm
Viburnum

Subspecies
P. b. bucephala
P. b. tenebrata

Gallery

References

Further reading
 South R. (1907) The Moths of the British Isles, (First Series), Frederick Warne & Co. Ltd., London & NY: 359 pp. online

External links

 
 Fauna Europaea
 Lepiforum e.V.

Notodontidae
Moths described in 1758
Moths of Asia
Moths of Europe
Taxa named by Carl Linnaeus